Halloween is an annual celebration on October 31.

Halloween may also refer to:

Film
Hallowe'en (1931 film), a Toby the Pup cartoon
Halloween (franchise), an American horror franchise including films and related merchandise
Halloween (1978 film), a film by John Carpenter
Halloween (2007 film), a remake by Rob Zombie
Halloween (2018 film), a sequel to the 1978 film by David Gordon Green

Literature
Halloween (children's book), a 2002 children's book by Jerry Seinfeld
Halloween (novel), a 1979 novelization of the 1978 film
"Halloween" (poem), a 1785 poem by Robert Burns
Halloween (MÄR), a character in MÄR
"Halloween", an issue of W.I.T.C.H.
"Halloween", a chapter  of Harry Potter and the Philosopher's Stone
Halloween, a character in Nick Sagan's Idlewild book series

Music

Groups
Halloween (band), an American heavy metal band formed in 1983

Albums
Halloween (soundtrack) (1979)
Halloween (Frank Zappa album) (2003)
Halloween (G.G.F.H. album) (1994)
Halloween (Mannheim Steamroller album) (2003)
Halloween (Two Steps from Hell album) (2012)
Halloween (EP), a 2009 EP by Zombie Girl
Halloween, a 1977 album by Pulsar

Songs
"Halloween" (Dave Matthews Band song), 1998
"Halloween" (Dead Kennedys song), 1982
"Halloween" (Matt Pond PA song), 2005
"Halloween" (Misfits song), 1981
"(Every Day Is) Halloween", by Ministry, 1984
"Halloween", by Aqua from Aquarius, 2000
"Halloween", by Ash, a B-side of "A Life Less Ordinary", 1997
"Halloween", by the Dream Syndicate from The Days of Wine and Roses, 1982
"Halloween", by Helloween from Keeper of the Seven Keys, Pt. 1, 1987
"Halloween", by Japan from Quiet Life, 1979
"Halloween", by King Diamond from Fatal Portrait, 1986
"Halloween", by Phoebe Bridgers from Punisher, 2020
"Halloween", by Siouxsie and the Banshees from Juju, 1981
"Halloween", by Sonic Youth, a B-side "Flower", 1986
"Halloween", by Zoogz Rift from Water II: At Safe Distance, 1987
"Halloween", from Be More Chill (Musical)

Compositions
 Hallowe'en (Ives), a 1907 composition for string quartet and piano by Charles Ives

Television episodes
"Halloween" (7th Heaven)
"Halloween" (8 Simple Rules)
"Halloween" (The Amazing World of Gumball)
"Halloween" (American Horror Story)
"Halloween" (Be Cool, Scooby-Doo!)
"Halloween" (Brooklyn Nine-Nine)
"Halloween" (Buffy the Vampire Slayer)
"Halloween" (Dr. Quinn, Medicine Woman)
"Halloween" (The Fitzpatricks)
"Halloween" (Frasier)
"Halloween" (Life Goes On)
"Halloween" (Malcolm in the Middle)
"Halloween" (Mike Hammer, Private Eye)
"Halloween" (Modern Family)
"Halloween" (The New Lassie)
"Halloween" (The Office)
"Halloween" (Phil of the Future)
"Halloween" (Teen Titans Go!)
"Halloween" (That '70s Show)
"Halloween" (Thomas & Friends)
"Halloween" (Totally Spies!)
"Halloween" (Wizards of Waverly Place)
"Halloween" (Yes, Dear)
"Halloween" (Yo Gabba Gabba!)
"Halloween", an episode of Bananas in Pyjamas
"Halloween!", an episode of Oobi
"Halloween", an episode of You Can't Do That on Television

Video games
Halloween (video game), a 1983 release on the Atari 2600 by Wizard Video
Feud (video game) or Halloween, a 1987 cross-platform adventure game by Bulldog

Other uses
Hallowe'en (clipper), an iron clipper ship launched in 1870
Halloween (horse), a British-trained racehorse active in the 1950s
Halloween (wrestler) or Manuel Ortiz (born 1971), professional wrestler

See also
All Hallows' Eve (disambiguation)
Halloween asteroid (disambiguation)
Halloween party
Halloween Problem, a phenomenon in database updates
Halloween II (disambiguation)
Helloween, a German power metal band